Following is a list of United States federal courthouses in the Eleventh Circuit, which is intended eventually to comprise all courthouses currently or formerly in use for the housing of United States federal courts under the jurisdiction of the United States Court of Appeals for the Eleventh Circuit. Each entry indicates the name of the building along with an image, if available, its location and the jurisdiction it covers, the person for whom it was named, if applicable, and the dates during which it was used as a federal courthouse. Dates of use will not necessarily correspond with the dates of construction or demolition of a building, as pre-existing structures may be adapted or court use, and former court buildings may later be put to other uses. Also, the official name of the building may be changed at some point after its use as a federal court building has been initiated.

Alabama

Florida

Georgia

Key

See also
List of United States district and territorial courts

References

11th Circuit
Federal courthouses, 11th Circuit